USS Rathburne (FF-1057) was a  of the US Navy. Despite the different spelling, she was named for Continental Navy officer John Rathbun (1746-1782).

Construction 
Rathburne was laid down 8 January 1968, by Lockheed Shipbuilding and Construction Company at Seattle, Washington. She was launched on 2 May 1969, sponsored by Mrs. Charles A. Bowsher, and commissioned on 16 May 1970.

Design and description
The Knox-class design was derived from the  modified to extend range and without a long-range missile system. They displaced  at full load. Their crew consisted of 13 officers and 211 enlisted men.

The ships were equipped with one Westinghouse geared steam turbine that drove the single propeller shaft.

The Knox-class ships were armed with a 5"/54 caliber Mark 42 gun forward and a single 3-inch/50-caliber gun aft. They mounted an eight-round RUR-5 ASROC launcher between the 5-inch (127 mm) gun and the bridge. SONAR equipment was the AN-SQS-26CX SONAR and the MK-114 Fire Control. Close-range anti-submarine defense was provided by two twin  Mk 32 torpedo tubes. The ships were equipped with a torpedo-carrying DASH drone helicopter; its telescoping hangar and landing pad were positioned amidships aft of the mack. Beginning in the 1970s, the DASH was replaced by a SH-2 Seasprite LAMPS I helicopter and the hangar and landing deck were accordingly enlarged. Most ships also had the 3-inch (76 mm) gun replaced by an eight-cell BPDMS missile launcher in the early 1970s.

Service history
Rathburne arrived at her home port of Pearl Harbor, Hawaii on 20 July 1970, and spent the remainder of that year and the first quarter of the next engaged in weapons systems' testing and various exercises. On 14 April 1971, she departed Pearl Harbor, for a six-month WestPac deployment, returning to Hawaii, on 27 October, for an extended upkeep period. After a short visit to the west coast in May and June 1972, Rathburne embarked upon her second tour of duty in WestPac 31 July 1972. She ended 1972, and began 1973, in the western Pacific, off the coast of Vietnam, and did not return to Pearl Harbor until 25 February 1973. She remained in the Pearl Harbor area throughout 1973 and was still operating there in January 1974.

Decommissioning
Rathburne was decommissioned on 14 February 1992, and stricken from the Naval Vessel Register on 11 January 1995. She was sunk as a target during fleet training exercise RIMPAC 2002 on 5 July 2002.

Notes

References

External links

DANFS Rathburne-II
Navsource images
Navysite.de

 

Ships built by Lockheed Shipbuilding and Construction Company
Knox-class frigates
Cold War frigates and destroyer escorts of the United States
1969 ships
Ships sunk as targets
Shipwrecks in the Pacific Ocean